The purple sandpiper (Calidris maritima) is a small shorebird in the sandpiper family Scolopacidae. This is a hardy sandpiper that breeds in the arctic and subarctic regions of Eurasia and North America and winters further south on the Atlantic coast.

Taxonomy
The purple sandpiper was formally described in 1764 by the Danish zoologist Morten Thrane Brünnich and given the binomial name Tringa maratina. This species was formerly placed in the genus Erolia. It is now placed with 23 other sandpipers in the genus Calidris that was introduced in 1804 by the German naturalist Blasius Merrem. The genus name is from Ancient Greek kalidris or skalidris, a term used by Aristotle for some grey-coloured waterside birds. The specific epithet maritima is from Latin and means "of the sea", from mare, "sea". The purple sandpiper is treated as monotypic: no subspecies are recognised. Within the genus Calidris the purple sandpiper is  sister to the rock sandpiper (Calidris ptilocnemis) and is closely related to the sanderling (Calidris alba) and the dunlin (Calidris alpina).

Description

Adults have short yellow legs and a medium thin dark bill with a yellow base. The body is dark on top with a slight purplish gloss and mainly white underneath. The breast is smeared with grey and the rump is black.

Distribution and habitat
The purple sandpiper's breeding range extends from the arctic islands of northern Canada, eastwards to Greenland, Iceland, Svalbard and northern Scandinavia across to Western Siberia and the Taymyr Peninsula. In the high arctic the sandpiper breeds at low altitude on the tundra, sometimes far from the coastline, but in the subarctic regions of Sweden and Norway it breeds on barren mountain sides near the limit of the frozen ground. Birds breeding at high latitudes migrate south and spend the winter on rocky shores on both sides of the north Atlantic. They winter along the North America coast as far south as South Carolina and on the eastern Atlantic coast as far south as France and northern Iberia.

Birds wintering in northern Scotland and southwest Ireland migrate to Canada (Baffin Island and Devon Island) to breed.

In Britain, these birds occur in winter in good numbers principally along the east and south coasts, where they favour rocky shorelines adjacent to the sea. It is much rarer as a breeding bird, found only in a localised area of the Cairngorms National Park, where 1–3 pairs have bred since 1978. Records of breeding by this species in the UK are monitored and archived by the Rare Breeding Birds Panel.

They are late migrants and move to rocky, ice-free Atlantic coasts in winter. Most go no further south than North Carolina and northern Portugal. They are fairly gregarious, forming small flocks, often with Ruddy Turnstones. This species is tame and approachable.

Behaviour and ecology

Breeding

Their breeding habitat is the northern tundra on Arctic islands in Canada and coastal areas in Greenland and northwestern Europe. They can breed at one year of age. The males makes several scrapes on the ground; the female chooses one and lays 3 or 4 eggs. The male takes the major responsibility for incubation of the eggs which hatch in 21–22 days. The chicks are covered with dense down. The upperparts have black and cinnamon patches with white specks; the underparts are mainly white. Usually only the male tends the chicks which can feed themselves. The maximum age recorded from ring-recovery data in Europe is 20 years and 9 months for a bird recovered in Sweden.

An apparent case of hybridization between this species and the dunlin has been reported from England.

Feeding
These birds forage on rocky coasts, picking up food by sight. They mainly eat arthropods and molluscs, also some plant material. One of the main staples are those of the Coelopa genera (C. frigida). These insects are known commonly as "seaweed flies" because they feed, mate, and create a habitat out of beached seaweed which is common near the Purple Sandpiper's habitat.

Status
The purple sandpiper has an extremely large range and although the population appears to be decreasing, the population is very large. The International Union for Conservation of Nature (IUCN) has judged that the threat to the species is of "Least concern". The purple sandpiper is one of the species to which the Agreement on the Conservation of African-Eurasian Migratory Waterbirds (AEWA) applies.

References

Sources

External links

 Purple sandpiper facts on BTO BirdFacts
Purple sandpiper information at eNature.com
 
 
 
 
 
 
 

purple sandpiper
purple sandpiper
Birds of the Arctic
Birds of Iceland
Birds of Scandinavia
purple sandpiper
purple sandpiper
Holarctic birds